The 2005 Mountain West Conference baseball tournament took place from May 23 through 27. All six of the league's teams met in the double-elimination tournament held at University of Utah's Franklin Covey Field. Top seeded UNLV won their third straight and third overall Mountain West Conference Baseball Championship with a championship game score of 7–4 and earned the conference's automatic bid to the 2005 NCAA Division I baseball tournament.

Seeding 
The teams were seeded based on regular season conference winning percentage only.

Results

All-Tournament Team

Most Valuable Player 
Matt Wagner, a pitcher for the champion UNLV Rebels, was named the tournament Most Valuable Player.

References 

Tournament
Mountain West Conference baseball tournament
Mountain West Conference baseball tournament
Mountain West Conference baseball tournament